These hits topped the Ultratop 50 in 2020.

See also
List of number-one albums of 2020 (Belgium)
2020 in music

References

Ultratop 50
Belgium Ultratop 50
2020